

This is a list of the Sites of Special Scientific Interest (SSSIs) in Derbyshire, England, United Kingdom. In England the body responsible for designating SSSIs is Natural England, which chooses a site because of its fauna, flora, geological or physiographical features. Natural England uses the borders of Derbyshire to mark one of its Areas of Search. , there are 99 sites designated in this Area of Search. There are 28 sites with a purely geological interest, and 54 listed for biological interest. A further 17 sites are designated for both reasons.

Natural England took over the role of designating and managing SSSIs from English Nature in October 2006 when it was formed from the amalgamation of English Nature, parts of the Countryside Agency and the Rural Development Service. Natural England, like its predecessor, uses the 1974–1996 county system and as such the same approach is followed here. The data in the table is taken from Natural England in the form of citation sheets for each SSSI, and the County Background Datasheet for Derbyshire.

For other counties, see List of SSSIs by Area of Search.

Sites

Notes

 Data rounded to one decimal place.
 Grid reference is based on the British national grid reference system, also known as OSGB36, and is the system used by the Ordnance Survey. Where an SSSI consists of multiple, non-contiguous sections, each section is assigned its own OS grid reference.
 Link to maps using the Nature  on the Map service provided by Natural England.

See also
List of SSSIs by Area of Search
List of Ancient Woods in England
Derbyshire Wildlife Trust
Peak District National Park

References

External links 
Natural England County Level Reports and Statistics
Natural England SSSI Introduction and search link

 
Derbyshire
Sites of Special
Geology of Derbyshire